Macropodid alphaherpesvirus 2 (MaHV-2) is a species of herpesvirus in the genus Simplexvirus. It was officially accepted as a valid species by the International Committee on Taxonomy of Viruses in 2004.

Hosts 
Macropodid alphaherpesvirus 2 has been detected in two species of captive macropods: grey dorcopsis (Dorcopsis luctuosa) and quokkas (Setonix brachyurus).

See also 
 Macropodid alphaherpesvirus 1

References

Further reading 

 
 

Alphaherpesvirinae